Nebo is an unincorporated community and census-designated place (CDP) in the Nebo Township of eastern McDowell County, North Carolina, United States. It was first listed as a CDP in the 2020 census with a population of 1,790.

The zip code is 28761.

History 
Nebo is named after a Methodist campground that existed before the Civil War. The Western North Carolina Railroad named its depot Nebo after the campground. The community was incorporated in 1909, with the repeal of the charter coming in 1943.

Attractions 
The primary attraction in Nebo is Lake James. Lake James State Park is located on its southern shore.

Education 
Nebo Elementary School is located in the community. It serves children in kindergarten through fifth grade. The school was part of the last junior high system in the state of North Carolina which was replaced by the standard middle school model in the 2015–2016 school year. Before being incorporated as an elementary school, Nebo was a high school. Part of the high school burnt down years ago, but the lunchroom remained.

Location 

The heart of Nebo is considered to be at the Nebo post office (28761). However, in recent times, Nebo has extended into Burke County due to new construction on Lake James. Some residents consider themselves to live in Nebo but reside just inside Burke County. This, however, is highly debatable, as the majority of residents of Nebo consider the boundary of Nebo to only cover the land area protected by the Nebo Volunteer Fire Department.

Demographics

2020 census

Note: the US Census treats Hispanic/Latino as an ethnic category. This table excludes Latinos from the racial categories and assigns them to a separate category. Hispanics/Latinos can be of any race.

References 

Unincorporated communities in McDowell County, North Carolina
Unincorporated communities in North Carolina
Populated places established in 1909
1943 disestablishments in the United States
Populated places disestablished in 1943
1909 establishments in North Carolina
Census-designated places in McDowell County, North Carolina
Census-designated places in North Carolina